George Weir (1903–1956) was an Australian barrister and politician.

George Weir may also refer to:

George Alexander Weir (1876–1951), British Army officer
George "Doddie" Weir (1970–2022), Scottish rugby union player
George Moir Weir (1885–1949), British Columbian educator and politician